International Lesbian Day, held on October 8, is a day of celebrating women loving women (WLW), along with the culture, history, and the diversity that comes with it. This day is celebrated by lesbians and allies with various community events, dances, and conferences and is mostly celebrated in New Zealand and Australia. Even though there is no specific date to when this day started, some say it started in New Zealand in 1980, but others say that it started in Australia in 1990.

In New Zealand 
International Lesbian Day in New Zealand is said to have started on March 8, 1980, with the very first Lesbian Day March on International Women's Day. The march only consisted of 40 women who marched through Wellington's Central Park.

In Australia 
The first international Lesbian Day event in Australia was held at the Collingwood Town Hall in Melbourne on October 13, 1990. They had featured musicians, market stalls, readings, and danced to live music. Since then, the lesbian community in Melbourne has celebrated this day either on or around October 8. Lesbians now ask the community to donate to charities that support lesbian women.

ACON, an LGBTQ health promotion organization that specialize in HIV prevention and support based in New South wales, used this day to launch their lesbian health strategy.

Lesbians On the Loose has used October 8 to celebrate their 20th anniversary.

Lesbian Visibility Day 
International Lesbian Day is also connected to Lesbian Visibility Day, which is held on April 26 and is believed to have been started in 2008. A day that allows lesbian role models to bring awareness to the issues that they face.

References 

Lesbian culture